Zgornja Kungota is a village and the seat of the Municipality of Kungota in the western part of the Slovene Hills in northeastern Slovenia.

The parish church in the village, from which the settlement gets its name, is dedicated to Saint Cunigunde and belongs to the Roman Catholic Archdiocese of Maribor. It is built close to the left bank of the Pesnica River southwest of the main settlement. It was first mentioned in written documents dating to 1391, but the current church dates to the 18th century, when the old core was extended and two chapels were added.

References

External links
Zgornja Kungota on Geopedia

Populated places in the Municipality of Kungota